As of September 2016, the International Union for Conservation of Nature (IUCN) lists 1851 near threatened plant species. 8.5% of all evaluated plant species are listed as near threatened. 
The IUCN also lists 51 subspecies and 73 varieties as near threatened. No subpopulations of plants have been evaluated by the IUCN.

This is a complete list of near threatened plant species, subspecies and varieties evaluated by the IUCN.

Bryophytes
There are two bryophyte species assessed as near threatened.

Mosses
Archidium elatum

Liverworts
Scapania sphaerifera

Pteridophytes
There are 25 pteridophyte species assessed as near threatened.

Leptosporangiate ferns

Isoetopsida

Lycopodiopsida

Gymnosperms
There are 168 species, two subspecies, and 29 varieties of gymnosperm assessed as near threatened.

Cycads

Species

Subspecies
Cycas maconochiei subsp. maconochiei

Conifers

Species

Subspecies
Abies cilicica subsp. cilicica
Varieties

Gnetopsida

Dicotyledons
There are 1378 species, 44 subspecies, and 41 varieties of dicotyledon assessed as near threatened.

Piperales

Species

Varieties
Piper augustum var. cocleanum

Campanulales

Theales
There are 45 species and two varieties in Theales assessed as near threatened.

Theaceae

Actinidiaceae

Guttiferae

Species

Varieties
Clusia havetioides var. havetioides
Clusia havetioides var. stenocarpa

Other Theales species

Malvales

Species

Subspecies
Elaeocarpus submonoceras subsp. collinus
Hibiscus waimeae subsp. waimeae, White kauai hibiscus
Varieties

Lecythidales

Santalales

Species

Varieties
Santalum insulare var. insulare
Santalum insulare var. raiateense

Proteales

Dipsacales

Plumbaginales

Rubiales

Species

Subspecies
Chimarrhis cymosa subsp. jamaicensis
Varieties
Psychotria pedunculata var. caudata

Violales

Euphorbiales
There are 52 species and two varieties in Euphorbiales assessed as near threatened.

Buxaceae
Buxus citrifolia
Buxus colchica

Euphorbiaceae

Species

Varieties
Euphorbia celastroides var. celastroides
Euphorbia celastroides var. hanapepensis

Laurales
There are 40 species, one subspecies, and one variety in the order Laurales assessed as near threatened.

Monimiaceae

Hernandiaceae

Lauraceae

Species

Subspecies
Apollonias barbujana subsp. barbujana
Varieties
Persea alpigena var. harrisii

Cucurbitales

Ebenales
There are 73 species, five subspecies, and one variety in Ebenales assessed as near threatened.

Symplocaceae

Sapotaceae

Species

Subspecies

Varieties
Isonandra perakensis var. perakensis

Ebenaceae

Styracaceae
Rehderodendron macrocarpum

Celastrales
There are 45 species, two subspecies, and two varieties in the order Celastrales assessed as near threatened.

Hollies

Species

Subspecies
Ilex perado subsp. azorica
Ilex perado subsp. perado
Varieties
Ilex savannarum var. savannarum
Ilex sideroxyloides var. occidentalis

Celastraceae

Dichapetalaceae
Dichapetalum witianum
Tapura magnifolia

Myrtales
There are 80 species and two varieties in the order Myrtales assessed as near threatened.

Myrtaceae

Melastomataceae

Species

Varieties
Memecylon acuminatum var. acuminatum

Combretaceae

Species

Varieties
Terminalia glabrata var. brownii

Thymelaeaceae

Lythraceae

Onagraceae
Epilobium psilotum
Fuchsia lehmannii

Sapindales
There are 113 species, six subspecies, and three varieties in the order Sapindales assessed as near threatened.

Rutaceae

Species

Subspecies
Esenbeckia pentaphylla subsp. pentaphylla
Varieties
Zanthoxylum dipetalum var. dipetalum

Sapindaceae

Species

Subspecies
Stadmannia oppositifolia subsp. rhodesiaca

Anacardiaceae

Species

Subspecies
Rhus glutinosa subsp. abyssinica
Varieties
Lannea schweinfurthii var. acutifoliolata
Lannea welwitschii var. ciliolata

Meliaceae

Species

Subspecies
Cabralea canjerana subsp. polytricha

Burseraceae

Species

Subspecies
Commiphora campestris subsp. campestris

Other Sapindales

Species

Subspecies
Kirkia burgeri subsp. somalensis

Asterales

Species

Subspecies
Artemisia campestris subsp. bottnica
Darwiniothamnus lancifolius subsp. glandulosus

Magnoliales
There are 82 species, eight subspecies, and two varieties in the order Magnoliales assessed as near threatened.

Magnoliaceae

Species

Varieties
Magnolia macrophylla var. ashei, Ashe's magnolia

Annonaceae

Species

Subspecies
Uvaria leptocladon subsp. leptocladon

Myristicaceae

Species

Subspecies

Varieties
Horsfieldia moluccana var. moluccana

Degeneriaceae
Degeneria roseiflora

Capparales

Apiales
There are 35 species, one subspecies, and two varieties in the order Apiales assessed as near threatened.

Araliaceae

Species

Varieties
Dendropanax nutans var. nutans
Dendropanax nutans var. obtusifolius

Umbelliferae

Species

Subspecies
Oenanthe pimpinelloides subsp. callosa

Gentianales

Rosales
There are 38 species, three subspecies, and four varieties in the order Rosales assessed as near threatened.

Cunoniaceae

Species

Varieties
Weinmannia laurina var. laurina

Rosaceae

Species

Subspecies
Polylepis tomentella subsp. tomentella
Sorbus austriaca subsp. croatica
Varieties
Prunus trichamygdalus var. elongata

Other Rosales

Species

Subspecies
Brunellia grandiflora subsp. grandiflora
Varieties
Brunellia inermis var. inermis
Grevea eggelingii var. eggelingii

Primulales
There are 21 species and two varieties in Primulales assessed as near threatened.

Myrsinaceae

Species

Varieties
Myrsine grantii var. tobiiensis
Myrsine ovalis var. ovalis

Theophrastaceae
Clavija longifolia

Primulaceae

Rhamnales

Urticales

Species

Varieties
Dorstenia hildebrandtii var. hildebrandtii

Solanales
There are 20 species and one subspecies in the order Solanales assessed as near threatened.

Solanaceae

Species

Subspecies
Solanum diversifolium subsp. diversifolium

Convolvulaceae
Convolvulus caput-medusae

Menyanthaceae
Nymphoides tenuissima

Scrophulariales
There are 48 species, one subspecies, and one variety in the order Scrophulariales assessed as near threatened.

Oleaceae

Species

Subspecies
Olea europaea subsp. cerasiformis

Gesneriaceae

Species

Varieties
Rhytidophyllum grande var. grande

Acanthaceae

Scrophulariaceae

Other Scrophulariales species

Lamiales
There are 33 species, two subspecies, and one variety in the order Lamiales assessed as near threatened.

Verbenaceae

Labiatae

Species

Subspecies
Mentha suaveolens subsp. timija
Teucrium eriocephalum subsp. almeriense

Boraginaceae

Species

Varieties
Tournefortia astrotricha var. subglabra

Nepenthales

Species

Subspecies
Sarracenia rubra subsp. rubra
Varieties
Sarracenia purpurea var. burkii

Dilleniales

Ranunculales

Ericales

Species

Subspecies
Erica scoparia subsp. platycodon

Podostemales

Fabales

Species

Subspecies

Varieties

Caryophyllales
There are 90 species in the order Caryophyllales assessed as near threatened.

Caryophyllaceae

Cactus species

Other Caryophyllales species

Fagales

Species

Subspecies
Quercus ilex subsp. ballota
Quercus petraea subsp. huguetiana

Other dicotyledons

Species

Subspecies
Erodium foetidum subsp. foetidum
Polygala tenuicaulis subsp. tayloriana
Varieties
Davidia involucrata var. involucrata

Monocotyledons
There are 278 species, five subspecies, and three varieties of monocotyledon assessed as near threatened.

Arecales

Species

Varieties
Rhopalostylis baueri var. baueri
Rhopalostylis baueri var. cheesemanii

Orchidales

Orchidaceae

Pandanales

Bromeliales

Liliales

Species

Subspecies
Aloe volkensii subsp. volkensii
Veratrum mengtzeanum subsp. phuwae

Arales
There are 21 species in Arales assessed as near threatened.

Araceae

Lemnaceae
Lemna yungensis

Zingiberales

Cyperales
There are 45 species, two subspecies, and one variety in Cyperales assessed as near threatened.

Gramineae

Species

Subspecies
Agrostis mannii subsp. mannii
Varieties
Pentameris pictigluma var. mannii

Cyperaceae

Species

Subspecies
Bulbostylis schoenoides subsp. erratica

Other monocotyledons

Species

Subspecies
Najas marina subsp. ehrenbergii, Spiny naiad

See also 
 Lists of IUCN Red List near threatened species
 List of least concern plants
 List of vulnerable plants
 List of endangered plants
 List of critically endangered plants
 List of recently extinct plants
 List of data deficient plants

Notes

References 

Plants
Near threatened plants